Eupoecilia aburica is a species of moth of the family Tortricidae. It was described by Józef Razowski in 1993, and is found in Ghana.

References

Endemic fauna of Ghana
Eupoecilia
Moths described in 1993
Taxa named by Józef Razowski
Moths of Africa